The 1966–67 Cypriot Second Division was the 12th season of the Cypriot second-level football league. ASIL Lysi won their 1st title.

Format
Twelve teams participated in the 1966–67 Cypriot Second Division. The league was split to two geographical groups, depending from Districts of Cyprus each participated team came from. All teams of a group played against each other twice, once at their home and once away. The team with the most points at the end of the season crowned group champions. The winners of each group were playing against each other in the final phase of the competition and the winner were the champions of the Second Division. The champion was promoted to 1967–68 Cypriot First Division.

Changes from previous season
Teams promoted to 1966–67 Cypriot First Division
 APOP Paphos FC

New members of CFA
 ASIL Lysi

Furthermore, PAEK returns to the league after 2 periods.

Nicosia-Keryneia-Famagusta Group
League standings

Limassol-Paphos Group
League standings

Champions Playoffs 
ASIL Lysi 4–1 Evagoras Paphos 
Evagoras Paphos  1–1 ASIL Lysi

ASIL Lysi were the champions of the Second Division. ASIL Lysi promoted to 1967–68 Cypriot First Division.

See also
 Cypriot Second Division
 1966–67 Cypriot First Division
 1966–67 Cypriot Cup

Sources 
 
 

Cypriot Second Division seasons
Cyprus
1966–67 in Cypriot football